Richard Nicos Tettey Nartey (born 6 September 1998) is an English professional footballer who plays as a defender for Salford City.

Career
Nartey signed for Chelsea as an Under-9. He began playing full-time for the club at age 16. He moved on loan to Burton Albion in June 2019. He was released by Chelsea at the end of the 2019–20 season.

In November 2020 he signed for Burnley. He signed a new contract with the club in June 2021, for 12 months with the option of a further year. He moved on a season-long loan to Mansfield Town on 31 August. He spent most of the season injured. In February 2022, following just three league appearances, it was announced that Nartey would remain on loan at Mansfield, but would return to Burnley to train with the club and play with their under-23 team. On 10 June, Burnley announced that he would leave the club at the end of the month when his contract expired.

In July 2022 he signed for Salford City.

Personal life
Born in England, Nartey is of Ghanaian descent. He attended St. Paul's School, London, leaving at age 16 following his GCSEs. He then studied A-Levels (maths and French) part time over 3 years whilst playing football.

Career statistics

References

1998 births
Living people
English footballers
Footballers from Hammersmith
Chelsea F.C. players
Burton Albion F.C. players
Burnley F.C. players
Mansfield Town F.C. players
Salford City F.C. players
English Football League players
English sportspeople of Ghanaian descent
Association football defenders
Black British sportspeople